Bethlehem Methodist Church is a historic church in Wildwood, Tennessee.

The church was organized in 1886 and its Gothic Revival building was completed that same year. The church building has a gable front and a prominent bell tower. The doorway and windows are crowned by Gothic arches, elements of the Gothic Revival style that was popular for late 19th-century churches in the region.

The congregation was dissolved in 1966, but the church is still used sometimes for weddings, funerals, and other special occasions. The church and its adjacent cemetery were added to the National Register of Historic Places in 1989.

References

Methodist churches in Tennessee
Churches on the National Register of Historic Places in Tennessee
Carpenter Gothic church buildings in Tennessee
Churches completed in 1886
19th-century Methodist church buildings in the United States
Buildings and structures in Blount County, Tennessee
National Register of Historic Places in Blount County, Tennessee